Paul Gauthier (30 August 1914 in La Flèche – 25 December 2002 in Marseille)  was a Catholic theologian and humanist, known best for his contributions to liberation theology.

Biography
He was born in La Flèche in 1914. At some point he was a professor at a seminary in Dijon. He lived in Nazareth, Palestine, from 1956-1967, leaving shortly after the Six Days' War. Gauthier was invited by Georges Hakim, Archbishop of Galilee, to speak to the Second Vatican Council, where he called on the Church to take on a more active role in social justice. While in Palestine, he was part of a group called "Companions of Jesus the Carpenter", providing aid to poverty-stricken people.  He died in Marseille in 2002.

One of his students was Enrique Dussel, who claimed that his time with Gauthier "opened [his] mind, [his] spirit, [his] flesh, to a project again unsuspected."

See also 
 Liberation theology
 Enrique Dussel

Bibliography
 Jesus, l'église et les pauvres(Jesus, the Church and the Poor) (1963)

References

Catholic theology and doctrine
Religion and politics
1914 births
2002 deaths